Pachyrhinus is a genus of pine needle weevils in the beetle family Curculionidae. There are more than 30 described species in Pachyrhinus.

Species
These 36 species belong to the genus Pachyrhinus:

 Pachyrhinus albidus (Fall, 1901)
 Pachyrhinus auriceps (Desbrochers des Loges, 1903)
 Pachyrhinus breviceps (Peyerimhoff, 1929)
 Pachyrhinus californicus (Horn, 1876) (rusty pineneedle weevil)
 Pachyrhinus cedri (Chevrolat, 1866)
 Pachyrhinus cinereus (Casey, 1888)
 Pachyrhinus crassicornis (Casey, 1888)
 Pachyrhinus dentipes (Seidlitz, 1867)
 Pachyrhinus desbrochersi (Raffray, 1873)
 Pachyrhinus distinctus (Hoffmann, 1942)
 Pachyrhinus elegans (Couper, 1865)
 Pachyrhinus eusomoides (Desbrochers des Loges, 1904)
 Pachyrhinus ferrugineus (Casey, 1888)
 Pachyrhinus glabratus (Chevrolat, 1866)
 Pachyrhinus grandiceps (Desbrochers des Loges, 1894)
 Pachyrhinus inermis (Desbrochers des Loges, 1897)
 Pachyrhinus javeti (Desbrochers des Loges, 1872)
 Pachyrhinus kocheri (Hoffmann, 1961)
 Pachyrhinus lateralis (Casey, 1888)
 Pachyrhinus lethierryi (Desbrochers des Loges, 1875)
 Pachyrhinus lopezi (Hoffmann, 1956)
 Pachyrhinus marginipennis Morimoto, 2015
 Pachyrhinus metallicus (Desbrochers des Loges, 1884)
 Pachyrhinus minutioculatus (Gandhi & Pajni, 1984)
 Pachyrhinus miscix (Fall, 1901)
 Pachyrhinus oxycedri (Fairmaire, 1884)
 Pachyrhinus phoeniceus (Fairmaire, 1883)
 Pachyrhinus pineti (Fairmaire, 1884)
 Pachyrhinus raffrayi (Desbrochers des Loges, 1872)
 Pachyrhinus scutellaris (Roelofs, 1873)
 Pachyrhinus squamosus (Kiesenwetter, 1852)
 Pachyrhinus squamulosus (Herbst, 1795)
 Pachyrhinus variabilis (Desbrochers des Loges, 1890)
 Pachyrhinus vidali (Hustache, 1946)
 Pachyrhinus warioni (Marseul, 1876)
 Pachyrhinus yasumatsui (Kono & Morimoto, 1960)

References

Further reading

External links

 

Entiminae
Articles created by Qbugbot